Electric locomotive EP1 is a Russian electric locomotive which has been produced by Novocherkassk Electric Locomotive Plant since 1998. It is the first Russian passenger electric locomotive with the 2o-2o-2o or Bo-Bo-Bo axle arrangement. There are, as December 2016, 866 of these locomotives.

History 
In the 1990s there were few passenger electric locomotives in Russia. The existing Chesh electric locomotives CHS4 and CHS4t were rather old to head passenger trains. A decision was therefore taken to commission a new electric passenger locomotive.

The first example of this locomotive was made in 1998, based on the existing VL65 design and modified for passenger traffic. The locomotive proved successful and was ordered in large numbers.

Modifications

Electric locomotive EP1M 
This locomotive is an EP1 with a new driver's cab, as featured in the 2ES4K locomotive. This cab features a new modern control console, and climate control. This variant first appeared in 2007.

Electric locomotive EP1P 
This locomotive is a further modification to the EP1M, featuring a more powerful motor, and also appeared in 2007.

See also
 The Museum of the Moscow Railway, at Paveletsky Rail Terminal, Moscow
 Rizhsky Rail Terminal, Home of the Moscow Railway Museum
 Varshavsky Rail Terminal, St.Petersburg, Home of the Central Museum of Railway Transport, Russian Federation
 History of rail transport in Russia

References 

Electric locomotives of Russia
5 ft gauge locomotives
Bo-Bo-Bo locomotives